Frank Coutts Hendry OBE, MC (1875–1955) served in the Indian Army Reserve, Merchant Navy,  Rangoon Pilot Service, was an Indian Army officer, and author. His Military Cross is in the Royal Museums Greenwich collections. Several of his books were published by William Blackwood's Blackwood's Magazine and William Blackwood & Sons. He used the pseudonym Shalimar. Hendry was an influence on Courtenay Latiner.

Hendry wrote from his own experiences. His time at sea included on Singapore ships. Hendry eventually retired to an area in the north of Scotland to focus on writing.

Bibliography
 A Windjammer's Half Deck
 The Ocean Tramp
 Land and Sea
 From all the seas (1933)
 One Monsoon Night (1936)
 Down to the Sea (1937)
 From the Log Book of Memory
 True tales of sail and steam 
 Sail Ho!
 The Yomah-and after
 En havets demon
 Deep seas and shoal rivers
 The peaceful wanderer
 From the log-book of memory (1950), an autobiography
 Around the horn and home again: and other tales (1929)
 Through the gap, short story
 Easting Down, short story

References

Indian Army personnel
Officers of the Order of the British Empire
1875 births
1955 deaths
British people in colonial India
British people in British Burma